Pinnichthys is a genus of ray-finned fish from the family Gobiidae. They are found in the western Atlantic and the eastern Pacific, the genus was named in 2016. Three species previously classified in the genus Chriolepis have been included in Pinnichthys.

Species
Five species have been assigned to this genus:

 Pinnichthys aimoriensis Van Tassell & Tornabene, 2016 (Thiony's goby)
 Pinnichthys atrimela (Bussing, 1997) (Black-cheek goby)
 Pinnichthys bilix (Hastings & Findley 2013) (Double-filament goby)
 Pinnichthys prolata (Hastings & Findley 2015) (Platform goby)
 Pinnichthys saurimimica Gilmore, Van Tassell & Tornabene, 2016 (Lizardfish goby)

There are no species listed under this genus in FishBase and the Catalog of Fishes classifies the Pacific species P. atrimela as Chriolepis atrimelus.

References

Gobiidae